Andrew D. Huberman is an American neuroscientist and tenured associate professor in the department of neurobiology and psychiatry and behavioral sciences at Stanford University School of Medicine who has made contributions to the brain development, brain plasticity, and neural regeneration and repair fields. Much of his work is focused on the visual system, including the mechanisms controlling light-mediated activation of the circadian and autonomic arousal centers in the brain, as well as brain control over conscious vision or sight. Huberman has been credited with coining the term "Non-Sleep Deep Rest" (NSDR), referring to practices that place the brain and body into shallow sleep to accelerate neuroplasticity and help offset mental and physical fatigue.

Education 

Huberman graduated from Henry M. Gunn High School in 1993. He received a B.A. from the University of California, Santa Barbara, in 1998, an M.A. from the University of California, Berkeley, in 2000, and a PhD in neuroscience from the University of California, Davis, in 2004.

Graduate and postdoctoral research 

From 1998 to 2000, Huberman worked in the laboratory of Irving Zucker, as well as working with Marc Breedlove, at University of California, Berkeley, as part of a team that defined how early androgen exposure impacts development, and he performed the first experiments defining the structure of binocular visual pathways that set the circadian clock in the hypothalamus. From 2000 to 2004, working as a PhD student in the laboratory of Barbara Chapman at the Center for Neuroscience at the University of California, Davis, Huberman discovered that neural activity and axon guidance molecules work in concert to ensure proper wiring of binocular maps in the brain. Huberman was a Helen Hay Whitney postdoctoral fellow researcher in the laboratory of Ben A. Barres from 2005 to 2010.

Huberman Laboratory

Research 

Huberman was an assistant professor of neurobiology and neuroscience at University of California, San Diego, from 2011 to 2015. His lab pioneered using genetic tools to study the visual system function, development and disease. Among the Huberman Lab's discoveries was the finding that specific types of retinal neurons degenerate early in glaucoma a common blinding disease depleting sight in over 70 million people, for which there is no cure.

After moving to Stanford in 2016, Huberman discovered and published the use of non-invasive methods such as visual stimulation to enhance regeneration of damaged retinal neurons, leading to partial recovery from blindness, especially when the stimulation is paired with specific forms of gene therapy. The work was covered extensively in the popular press, including Time magazine and Scientific American and is part of the National Eye Institute's Audacious Goals Initiative to restore vision to the blind . The Huberman Lab extended those findings to develop a human clinical trial using virtual reality technology to stimulate regeneration and plasticity of damaged retinal and other visual system neurons.

In 2017, the Huberman Lab created a virtual reality platform for probing the neural mechanisms underlying pathological fear and anxiety. That work involved collecting 360-degree video of various fear-inducing scenarios such as heights and claustrophobia as well as atypical fear-inducing situations such as swimming with great white sharks. The Huberman VR platform is aimed at making discoveries that will lead to developing new tools for humans to adjust their state in order to promote adaptive coping with stress. The first installment of that work was published in Current Biology, in 2021 as a collaboration with neurosurgeon and neuroscientist Edward Chang (UCSF), wherein they reported that specific patterns of insular cortex brain activity correlate with and may predict anxiety responses.

In May, 2018, Huberman Laboratory published an article in the journal Nature reporting its discovery of two new mammalian brain circuits: one that promotes fear and paralysis, and another that promotes "courageous"/confrontational reaction, to visually-evoked threats. That discovery prompted the now ongoing exploration of how these brain regions may be involved in humans suffering from anxiety-related disorders such as phobias and generalized anxiety.

In 2020, Huberman initiated a collaboration with the laboratory of David Spiegel in the Stanford Department of Psychiatry and Behavioral Sciences, to systematically study how particular patterns of respiration (i.e., breathing/breathwork) and the visual system influence the autonomic nervous system, stress, and other brain states, including sleep.

Honors and awards 
 McKnight Foundation Scholar
 Pew Biomedical Scholar
 2016 Catalyst for a Cure Team Member
 2017 ARVO Cogan Award for Contributions to Vision Science and Ophthalmology

Podcast 
In 2021, Huberman launched the "Huberman Lab" podcast with the goal of translating neuroscience into tools that can be applied in everyday life. It is a top podcast on Apple Podcasts and Spotify. He was originally inspired to start the podcast after his appearance on the Lex Fridman Podcast. Huberman also covers the evidence on supplements which include Tongkat Ali (Eurycoma Longifolia), Fadogia Agrestis and many others.

References

External links 
 Huberman Lab
 Andrew D. Huberman at Stanford Medicine
 Youtube Channel
 Twitter

American neuroscientists
Living people
People from Palo Alto, California
Scientists from California
University of California, Santa Barbara alumni
University of California, Berkeley alumni
University of California, Davis alumni
University of California, San Diego faculty
Stanford University faculty
Vision scientists
Gunn High School alumni
American podcasters
Year of birth missing (living people)